James Gideon Monahan (January 12, 1855 – December 5, 1923) was a U.S. Representative from Wisconsin.

Born at Willow Springs, near Darlington, Wisconsin, Monahan attended the common schools and graduated from the Darlington High School in 1875. He studied law and was admitted to the bar in 1878. He commenced practice in Mineral Point, Wisconsin.
He returned to Darlington in 1880. He served as district attorney of Lafayette County 1880-1884.
From 1883 till 1919 he was editor and owner of the Darlington Republican Journal.
He served as delegate to the Republican National Convention in 1888.
He also served as collector of internal revenue for the second Wisconsin district 1900-1908.

He was a member of Evening Star Masonic Lodge #64 F&AM Wisconsin and served as the Most Worshipful Grand Master of Masons in Wisconsin in 1898.

Monahan was elected as a Republican to the Sixty-sixth Congress (March 4, 1919 – March 3, 1921) as the representative of Wisconsin's 3rd congressional district.
He was an unsuccessful candidate for renomination in 1920 to the Sixty-seventh Congress.
He died in Dubuque, Iowa, December 5, 1923.
He was interred in Union Grove Cemetery, Darlington, Wisconsin.

References

Sources

1855 births
1923 deaths
People from Darlington, Wisconsin
Wisconsin lawyers
Editors of Wisconsin newspapers
Republican Party members of the United States House of Representatives from Wisconsin
American male journalists
People from Willow Springs, Wisconsin
19th-century American lawyers